Chaplet may refer to:

 Chaplet (headgear), a wreath or garland for the head
 Chaplet (prayer), a string of prayer beads and the associated prayer
 Chaplet (metallurgy), a metal form to hold a core in place

See also
 Wreath (attire)
 Ukrainian wreath